Chess at the 26th Southeast Asian Games was held at Jayakarta Hotel in Palembang, Indonesia between 17–21 November 2011.

Medal summary

Men

Women

Mixed

Medal table

References

External links 
 Result of tournaments in Chess-Results.com

2011 Southeast Asian Games events
Southeast Asian Games
2011